Blutzeuge (German for "blood witness") was a term used in Nazi Germany for members of the National Socialist German Workers' Party (NSDAP) and associated organizations considered to be martyrs. Blutzeuge was used in Nazi propaganda in the 1930s and 1940s depicting a hero cult of "fallen" Nazis who had been murdered by opponents in the political violence in Germany during the Weimar Republic and after the seizure of control in January 1933. An early Nazi usage of the term was Adolf Hitler's dedication at the start of Mein Kampf, which he dedicated to the sixteen NSDAP members killed in the 1923 Beer Hall Putsch.

Notable Blutzeuge
 Wilhelm Gustloff, founder of the NSDAP/AO branch in Switzerland assassinated in 1936.
 Herbert Norkus, 15-year-old member of the Hitler Youth murdered in a fight with Roter Frontkämpferbund youths in 1932. 
 Max Erwin von Scheubner-Richter, early prominent NSDAP member and close associate of Adolf Hitler killed in the Beer Hall Putsch in 1923.
 Albert Leo Schlageter, member of the Freikorps executed for sabotage in the Occupation of the Ruhr in 1923.
 Horst Wessel, leading member of the Sturmabteilung in Berlin assassinated in 1930.

Gallery

References

Nazi propaganda
Martyrdom